Buller District Council is the territorial authority for the Buller District of New Zealand.

The council is led by the mayor of Buller, who is currently . There are also ten ward councillors, two representing Seddon Ward, six representing Westport Ward, and two representing Inangahua Ward.

Composition

Westport Ward has six councilors: Deputy Mayor Sharon Roche, Robyn Nahr, Joanne Howard, Grant Weston, Margaret Montgomery and Phil Rutherford. Inangahua Ward has two councillors: Dave Hawes and John Bougen. Seddon Ward has two councillors: Rosalie Sampson and Martin Hill.

There is also a non-elected Māori Portfolio Councillor, Francois Tumahai.
 
Inangahua Community Board has six members: Alun Bollinger, Linda Webb, Ina Lineham, Cory Aitken, Dave Hawes	and John Bougen.

History

The council was formed in 1989, replacing Buller County Council (1876-1989) and Westport County Council (1873-1989).

In 2020, the council had 109 staff, including 17 earning more than $100,000. According to the right-wing Taxpayers' Union think tank, residential rates averaged $1,949.

References

External links
 Official website

Buller District
Territorial authorities of New Zealand